Opostegoides albellus is a moth of the family Opostegidae. It was described by Sinev in 1990, and is known from Japan.

The wingspan is about 10 mm.

External links
 Opostegoides albellus at www.jpmoth.org.

Opostegidae
Moths of Japan
Moths described in 1990